Kodagahalli is a small village in Mysore district of Karnataka state, India.

Location
Kodagahalli is located between Bannur and Srirangapatna on Karighatta road.

See also
 Mandyakoppalu
 Arakere
 Karighatta Road
 Bannur

Image gallery

References

Villages in Mysore district